Carl Hughes is a professional rugby league footballer who has played in the 2000s and 2010s. He has played for Stanley Rangers ARLFC, York City Knights, Featherstone Rovers (Heritage № 859), Keighley and Doncaster (Heritage № 1062).

References

External links
Stanley Rangers ARLFC - Roll of Honour

Featherstone Rovers players
Keighley Cougars players
Doncaster R.L.F.C. players
English rugby league players
Living people
Place of birth missing (living people)
Year of birth missing (living people)
York City Knights players